The FIBT World Championships 1997 took place in St. Moritz, Switzerland (Bobsleigh) and Lake Placid, New York, United States (Skeleton). St. Moritz hosted a championship event for the record eighteenth time. The Swiss city had hosted the event previously in 1931 (Four-man), 1935 (Four-man), 1937 (Four-man), 1938 (Two-man), 1939 (Two-man), 1947, 1955, 1957, 1959, 1965, 1970, 1974, 1977, 1982, 1987, 1989 (Skeleton), and 1990 (Bobsleigh). Meanwhile, Lake Placid hosted a championship event for the seventh time, doing so previously in 1949, 1961, 1969, 1973, 1978, and 1983.

Two man bobsleigh

Italy earned its first world championships medal since 1971.

Four man bobsleigh

Men's skeleton

Medal table

References
2-Man bobsleigh World Champions
4-Man bobsleigh World Champions
Men's skeleton World Champions

IBSF World Championships
International sports competitions hosted by Switzerland
Sport in St. Moritz
International sports competitions hosted by the United States
Sports in Lake Placid, New York
1997 in skeleton
1997 in bobsleigh
1997 in Swiss sport
1997 in American sports
Bobsleigh in Switzerland 
Bobsleigh in the United States
Skeleton in the United States